Moltoni's warbler (Curruca subalpina) is a small bird species of the family Sylviidae. It is named after its describer Edgardo Moltoni.

It breeds in Corsica, Sardinia, areas around the Ligurian Sea and the Balearic Islands.

It is a bird of dry open country, often on hill slopes, with bushes for nesting. The nest is built in low shrub or gorse, and 3–5 eggs are laid. Like most "warblers", it is insectivorous, but will also eat berries. It winters in Algeria and Sub-Saharan West Africa.

It was until recently considered a subspecies of the western subalpine warbler, from which it differs by a shorter trill and a pinker rather than orange underside.

The specific subalpina is Latin for "below the mountains".

References

Moltoni's warbler
Birds of Southern Europe
Birds of North Africa
Moltoni's warbler